Mohammad Alipour Rahmati (born 1962) is an Iranian politician.

Alipour Rahmati was born in Chaldoran, West Azerbaijan. He is a member of the 9th Islamic Consultative Assembly from the electorate of Maku, Chaldoran, Poldasht and Showt. and member of Iran-Turkey Friendship society. Alipour Rahmati won with 37,063 (33.93%) votes.

References

People from West Azerbaijan Province
Deputies of Maku, Chaldoran, Poldasht and Showt
Living people
1962 births
Members of the 9th Islamic Consultative Assembly
Followers of Wilayat fraction members